The Phantom of Heilbronn, often alternatively referred to as the "Woman Without a Face", was a hypothesized unknown female serial killer whose existence was inferred from DNA evidence found at numerous crime scenes in Austria, France and Germany from 1993 to 2009. The six murders among these included that of police officer Michèle Kiesewetter, in Heilbronn, Germany on 25 April 2007.

The only connection between the crimes was the presence of DNA from a single female, which had been recovered from 40 crime scenes, ranging from murders to burglaries. In late March 2009, investigators concluded that there was no "phantom criminal", and the DNA had already been present on the cotton swabs used for collecting DNA samples; it belonged to a woman who worked at the factory where they were made.

Investigation 
An analysis of the mitochondrial DNA from samples collected in Austria showed characteristics most often found among people in Eastern Europe and neighbouring Russia. This was not discovered in the German investigations, as, at the time, DNA could only be used to determine few attributes, such as sex. Since at least 2008, some officers suspected that the evidence was misleading, and the DNA presence was due to contamination, which was confirmed in 2009.

The investigations were concentrated in a special task force named Parkplatz ("parking lot") at the Heilbronn police department. In January 2009, the reward for clues regarding the whereabouts of the Phantom was increased to €300,000.

The existence of the Phantom had been doubted earlier, but in March 2009, the case took a new turn when, while trying to identify a corpse, investigators found the Phantom's female DNA in fingerprints on a male asylum seeker's application. They subsequently came to the conclusion that there was no mysterious criminal and the laboratory results were due to contamination of the cotton swabs used for DNA probing. Although sterile, the swabs were not certified for human DNA collection.

The cotton swabs used by many state police departments were found to have been contaminated before shipping. It was found that the contaminated swabs all came from the same factory, which employs several Eastern European women who fit the type the DNA was assumed to match. The Bavarian police obtained their swabs from a different factory, which explains why no DNA of the supposed Phantom was ever found in Bavaria, although that state is close to many of the crime scenes where this DNA was found.

Associated crimes 
The "Phantom's DNA" was found in samples collected at the sites of, or on evidence related to, the following crimes:
 on a cup after the killing of a 62-year-old woman on 25–26 May 1993 in Idar-Oberstein, Germany (the DNA was analysed in 2001)
 on a kitchen drawer after the killing of a 61-year-old man on 21 March 2001 in Freiburg, Germany
 on a syringe containing heroin in October 2001 in a wooded area near Gerolstein, Germany
 on the leftovers of a cookie in a trailer that was forcefully opened on the night of 24 October 2001 in Budenheim, Germany
 on a toy pistol after the 2004 robbery of Vietnamese gemstone traders in Arbois, France
 on a projectile after a fight between two brothers on May 6, 2005 in Worms, Germany
 on a stone used for smashing a window, after a burglary on 3 October 2006 in Saarbrücken, Germany (DNA was discovered and analysed only 2008)
 after a March 2007 burglary at an optometrist’s store in Gallneukirchen, Upper Austria
 after 20 burglaries and thefts of cars and motorbikes between 2003 and 2007 in Hesse, Baden-Württemberg and Saarland, Germany; Tyrol, Austria; and Upper Austria
 on a car used to transport the bodies of three Georgians killed on 30 January 2008 in Heppenheim, Germany (the DNA was analysed on 10 March 2008)
 after a burglary on the night of 22 March 2008 in a disused public swimming pool in Niederstetten, Germany
 after four cases of home invasion in Quierschied (twice), Tholey and Riol, Germany in March and April 2008;
 after an apartment break-in in Oberstenfeld-Gronau during the night of 9 April 2008
 after the robbery of a woman on 9 May 2008 in a club house in Saarhölzbach
 in the car of an auxiliary nurse who was found dead at the end of October 2008 near Weinsberg, Germany

Consequence 
As a consequence of this severe case of contamination with human DNA in a series of forensic investigations, the International Organization for Standardization (ISO) published the standard ISO 18385 in 2016 to define the requirements for producing consumables free of human DNA contamination designated for collecting biological evidence at crime scenes: "Minimizing the risk of human DNA contamination in products used to collect, store and analyse biological material for forensic purposes".

Literature 
 Michel Ferracci-Porri: * Le Fantôme de Heilbronn ("The Phantom of Heilbronn's Affair") Editions Normant, France 2009 References 

 External links 
 Reward for 'phantom killer' reaches record €300,000, The Local, January 13, 2009
 Allan Hall: 'Woman Without A Face' leaves German police in the dark, The Age, November 17, 2008
 Ned Temko: Germany's hunt for the murderer known as 'the woman without a face', The Guardian, November 9, 2008
 DNA clues in hunt for 'faceless' serial killer, The Daily Telegraph, April 14, 2008
 Tristana Moore: Germany hunts phantom killer, BBC, 11 April 2008
 Allan Hall: Police step up hunt for serial killer, 'the woman without a face', The Scotsman, April 10, 2008
 Roger Boyes: Junkie's needle may lead to woman serial killer, Irish Independent, June 29, 2007
 Peter M. Schneider: Forensische DNA-Analyse: Fall eines Phantoms – und die Folgen'', Deutsches Ärzteblatt, 2009; 106(24): A-1239 / B-1057 / C-1029

1993 murders in Germany
2000s in Baden-Württemberg
2009 murders in Germany
20th century in Baden-Württemberg
DNA profiling techniques
Heilbronn
People from Heilbronn
Unsolved murders in Germany